The Mindszenti originates in Mátra at 450 metres above sea level, south of Mátramindszent, Nógrád County, Hungary. It flows northward to Nemti, where it enters the Zagyva.

Settlements on the banks

 Mátramindszent
 Nemti

Rivers of Hungary